Country Croonin' is an RIAA Gold-certified album by Canadian country music artist Anne Murray. It was released by Straightway Records in the fall of 2002.

The disc peaked at #13 on the Billboard Top Country Albums chart and sold over 500,000 copies in the United States alone.

Track listing

Charts

Weekly charts

Year-end charts

References

2002 albums
Anne Murray albums